Robert Cole Nelson (January 30, 1920 – November 3, 1985) was an American football player.

A native of Paris, Texas, Nelson attended Bryan High School and then played college football at Baylor University.

He also played professional football in the National Football League (NFL) and All-America Football Conference (AAFC) as a center, tackle, and linebacker for the Detroit Lions (1941, 1945), the Los Angeles Dons (1946–1949), and Baltimore Colts (1950). He appeared in 71 NFL/AAFC games, 52 as a starter, and kicked six field goals and 37 extra points.

References

1920 births
1986 deaths
People from Paris, Texas
Baylor Bears football players
Detroit Lions players
Los Angeles Dons players
Baltimore Colts players
Players of American football from Texas